Soemmeringia semperflorens is a species of flowering plants in the legume family, Fabaceae. It belongs to the subfamily Faboideae, and was recently assigned to the informal monophyletic Dalbergia clade of the Dalbergieae. It is the only member of the genus Soemmeringia.

References

Dalbergieae
Monotypic Fabaceae genera